Eupithecia quercetica is a moth in the family Geometridae. It is found in Ukraine, Bulgaria, North Macedonia, Greece, Crete, Cyprus and the Near East.

The wingspan is 18–20 mm.

References

Moths described in 1938
quercetica
Moths of Europe
Moths of Asia